The Dark Crusade is the fourth book in a series by Walter H. Hunt, first published in 2005.

2005 novels
2005 science fiction novels